Emmitt is a given name and a surname. Notable people with the name include:

Surname
Drew Emmitt, musician
Fern Emmett (1896-1946), American actress
Jacob Emmitt, rugby league player for Wales, St. Helens, and Castleford Tigers
John Emmitt (1825-1901), American farmer and politician
Lionel Emmitt, rugby league player for Wales, and Blackpool Borough
Robert A. Emmitt (1850-1937), American politician

Given name
Emmitt Peters (1940−2020), American hunter, trapper, and dog musher
Emmitt Smith (born 1969), American football player
Emmitt Thomas (born 1943), American football coach
Emmitt Williams (born 1998), American basketball player

Fictional characters
Emmitt Otterton, an otter in the computer-animated movie Zootopia

See also
Emmett (name), given name and surname